Mark Picchiotti is an American DJ, producer, remixer and songwriter based out of Chicago, Illinois. As a remixer and producer, Picchiotti has amassed 24 number one singles on the Billboard Dance Club Songs chart, and he has remixed such artists as Beyoncé, Katy Perry, Mariah Carey, Rihanna, Daft Punk, The Killers, AC/DC, Florence and The Machine, Amy Grant, Foster The People, Michael Jackson, Madonna, Sia, Sybil, Enriqué Iglesias, and Mary J. Blige. In 2002, he produced and co-wrote the Kylie Minogue single “Give It To Me” for her 8x-Platinum album Fever. Picchiotti was also voted one of the 40 most influential remixers of all time by UK publication Blues & Soul Magazine. His DJ residencies at nightclubs in his hometown of Chicago have included Shelter, Smartbar, Berlin, Crobar, and Medusa’s; as well as UK nightclubs Ministry of Sound (London) and Hard Times (Leeds). He continues to travel the globe performing at notable clubs such as Pacha (Portugal) and El Divino (Ibiza). He has also headlined the Sydney Gay and Lesbian Mardi Gras festival and DJed its infamous daytime after-party Laneway.

Mark Picchiotti owns and operates the imprint Blueplate Records, home to his own acts Basstoy, Sandstorm, Fondue, and Streetlife. Picchiotti is also a member of several dance music duos: The Absolute, Nightman, and Doctorz, MD. Mark Picchiotti’s music has been described as house, gospel house, soulful house, and progressive house. Additionally, Billboard Magazine says of Mark’s music, “His ear for soulful rhythm is matched by a knack for sweet pop melody construction.” In the 1990s, his work with Suzanne Palmer, “There Will Come A Day” and the follow-up single “I Believe”, earned Picchiotti the mantle “Godfather of Gospel House” by music journalists.

Biography
Mark Picchiotti first rose to prominence in 1991 when he produced fellow Chicago artist LaTour's eponymous debut album, spawning the controversial Top 40 hit single “People Are Still Having Sex”. This song would become Picchiotti’s first production to reach #1 on Billboard Dance, and it was used by American figure skater Tonya Harding in her program at the 1992 Winter Olympics. LaTour’s album also featured “Blue”, a song used in the iconic film Basic Instinct (starring Sharon Stone).

In 1994, using the alias Streetlife, Picchiotti first collaborated with gospel house singer Dana Divine on the song “Love Breakdown”, released on Tribal America Records. As a result of that successful pairing, Dana was featured on one of Mark’s biggest productions, “Runnin’” by Basstoy. The single reached #13 on the UK Singles Chart, #1 on the UK Club chart, and #3 on Billboard Dance Club Songs. Dana was again featured on the follow-up single “Turn It Up”, which also saw worldwide success, reaching #1 on Billboard Dance, #1 on the UK’s Upfront Music Chart, and #1 on the DMC World Music Chart, and securing a spot as Billboard’s #3 club song of the year.

In 1995, Mark Picchiotti began working with Craig Snider and acclaimed dance music vocalist Suzanne Palmer, spawning “There Will Come A Day” and “I Believe” under the name The Absolute. Regarding their collaboration, Palmer recounts, “As I did more performing, I began to sing commercials for radio and TV, and I came to the attention of Mark Picchiotti, a house music producer from Chicago and his music collaborator, Craig Snider, a jingle writer and producer.” She continues, “That’s how I got my break in dance music.”

In 1997, Picchiotti DJed the release party for Janet Jackon’s album Velvet Rope at Sony Pictures Studios in Culver City, CA. That same year, Mark started his own dance music record label, Blueplate Records, on which numerous Billboard-charting and critically-acclaimed projects have been released. Notable signings to Blueplate include:

 Bebe Zahara Benet (the season one winner of RuPaul’s Drag Race)
 Kylie Minogue
 Basstoy (whose songs "Magic" and "Turn It Up" reached #1 on Billboard, among other charting hits)
 Alec Sun Drae
 Sybil
 Ralphi Rosario (whose tracks “Everybody Shake It” and “C’mon Get Funky” reached #1 and #2 on Billboard, respectively)
 Eric Kupper & Peyton
 Blueplate Allstars
 Deep Influence
 Sandstorm
 Mark’s own gospel act The Absolute featuring dance diva Suzanne Palmer

1998 marked the beginning of Mark’s affiliation with Strictly Rhythm, an iconic American dance record label, with a production and distribution deal for physical CDs and vinyl. He also began working with the UK-based duo Lighthouse Family. After having gained the band’s respect with his remix of their track “Raincloud”, Mark was asked to work with the band on their following album. Subsequently, he was asked to DJ the Lighthouse Family world tour wrap party in Newcastle, England.

In 1999, Mark was approached by Parlophone/EMI to produce a track for UK-based pop singer Kylie Minogue on her then-upcoming album Light Years. As a result, Picchiotti produced the 2000 club hit “Butterfly” (#14 on Billboard Dance), and he negotiated a deal which allowed him to commission an accompanying remix EP and release it under his Blueplate imprint as a limited run. His work with Minogue continued, and he produced and co-wrote the single “Give It To Me” for her 8x-Platinum album Fever, released in 2002. He also remixed Kylie’s 2008 single “All I See” and her 2013 single “Skirt”.

In 2004, while continuing to balance his roles as a DJ and remixer, Mark signed the Leeds-based act Jersey St. and produced their single “Love Will be Our Guide”, released on Defected Records.

In 2009, Picchiotti accepted the request to be the official DJ for reality TV show RuPaul’s Drag Race Winner’s Tour, sponsored by Absolut Vodka. Mark signed season one winner Bebe Zahara Benet and produced three of her singles; “I’m The Sh*t”, “Cameroon”, and “Dirty Drums”, all of which were Blueplate releases. Mark toured with the show again following its second season.

The same year, Mark formed a joint venture with the renowned record label Strictly Rhythm, establishing a 50/50 partnership called Blueplate Global. 2009 was also the year that Picchiotti collaborated with UK artist Alec Sun Drae to produce the single “Feel Like Singin’”, a Blueplate Global release. The two continued their collaboration in 2010 when Mark produced the single “Let The Music Guide You”. Later, Mark produced Matt Zarley’s LP Change Begins With Me, which won Outmusic Awards’ Album of the Year in 2012. The title track won Outmusic Awards’ Single of the Year and Rightout TV’s Best Song So Far that same year. Commercially, it was an international success; the release spent four weeks at #1 on Eurochart, and two songs from the album, “WTF” and “Trust Me”, charted on Billboard Dance.

In 2013, Mark continued to remix releases from high-profile artists, including the Daft Punk single “Get Lucky” and Enriqué Iglasias’ “Turn The Night Up”, both reaching #1 on Billboard Dance. In 2014, Mark produced the dance version of Amy Grant’s “Better Than A Hallelujah”, which was released as a single and was also featured on her album In Motion: The Remixes. Most recently, Picchiotti made a deal with Defected Records for several of his back-catalog titles; his 1998 track “Pump The Boogie” was included as the title track on their Glitterbox compilation of the same name.

2020 was a banner year for Picchiotti. He produced a remix for “Pump The Boogie”, which was released on Glitterbox/Defected, and he collaborated with vocalist Kenyata White to produce the disco single “Love is the Message” (released on Quantize Recordings). In addition, he worked with artist Javi Star (also known as Weezy, the coach of the Phoenix Suns Solar Squad) and his brother, Amani Jae, producing the R&B-influenced track “I Got You”, which was released on the storied Studio 54. Marking his 25-year-long collaborative relationship with dance diva Suzanne Palmer, Mark also produced the disco single “Love Reaction”, a Nervous Records release.

Discography

Remixes

Productions

See also
List of artists who reached number one on the U.S. Dance chart

References

Year of birth missing (living people)
Living people
Club DJs
American DJs
Record producers from Illinois
Musicians from Chicago
Remixers
Electronic dance music DJs